Yang Hormat Dato' Francissca Peter , also known as Fran, is a Malaysian singer-songwriter.

Early life and background
Francissca was born into in Malaysia of Ceylonese (Sri Lankan/Scottish) and Chinese family, to Alice Peter and Lucian G. Peter (embraced Islam in 2007 and changed his name to Muhammad Gaberial Peter Abdullah). She was the second of four siblings. Her father — an ex British soldier in the army during Malaya days teaching English grammar to the British soldiers then went on to be one of the first Reuters, Bernama then later joined New Straits Times and then went on to start the New paper, The Straits Echo'. He  turned to  alcoholism becos he was not happy and was very anti establishment and he eventually abandoned the family in 1978.  Her mother had to raise Francissca and her siblings single-handedly with help from a handful of people and The Canossian Nuns. 

Despite being born in Klang, Selangor, Fran spent most of her childhood in Ipoh, Perak. She attended Main Convent Ipoh and then Tarcisian Convent Ipoh. The family moved to Petaling Jaya permanently in 1982 and she was enrolled at a co-ed school in Selayang. Francissca left school after Form Three, took up a typingwriting  course, and started working as a salesgirl/rep in a Batik factory and shop for Tourist to help support her family but A year later, with money being tight, Fran took the decision to go into singing. She and her mother scoured through the newspapers together, searching for agents who would help Fran secure a singing job.

After her marriage, Francissca moved overseas - first to the US, then UK, and China (Guangzhou and Hong Kong) - in the 1990s, before relocating back to Malaysia in 2001.

Career
In 1987, she was the first Malaysian artist to win the International Award for "Best Song" at the 'Asean Song Festival' held in Kuala Lumpur, Malaysia. She is also known nationwide for her rendition of Malaysia's second national anthem Setia.

In 1987, her album Kau Bintangku was almost banned as the album cover had her wearing a crucifix. Warner Music digitally edited the album cover and put it back on the shelves.

In 2007, she was the lead soloist in the "Musical SPEX – A Spiritual Journey" held outdoors at night in Malacca. Also in the same year, Warner Music Malaysia released a double compilation CD album titled Berlian containing her 19 popular hits and 1 new song in 2007. Warner also released two other compilation albums in 2008, one in March 2008 titled Nostalgia Abadi (Forever Nostalgic) and another in 2009 titled Memori Hit (Hit Memories). Keunggulan Francissca Peter (The Very Best of Francissca Peter), a 37-song compilation album, was released in late January 2010.

Keunggulan 33 Tahun Francissca Peter Concert

On 4–6 February 2011, in conjunction with her 33 years in the Malaysian music industry, Fran held her first Solo Concert "Keunggulan 33 Tahun Francissca Peter" concert at The Panggung Sari, Istana Budaya. Being the most successful non-Malay female entertainer in the local music industry, Fran was given the honour of being the first non-Malay Entertainer ever to perform a solo concert at the prestigious Istana Budaya. It was a sold-out, 3-night concert with Fran performing 33 songs each night with a 33-piece Orchestra. Fran received a standing ovation on all three nights including rave reviews in
the local dailies and alternative media.

Consequently, in March 2011, Warner Music Malaysia released her box set of all her albums nationally 10 CDs (except for Masih Merindu album which was under an independent label). Also included in the Box Set was a new single Tiada Gementar Lagi recorded specially for her fans as a thank you for the years of love and support given to her for the "Konsert Keunggulan 33 Tahun" (February 2011).

Charity work
She is known as the "Fundraising Queen" in Malaysia. In 2013, she released the album The Love & Hope consisting of 11 songs. Funds raised from the sale of this album went to the World Vision Child Development Fund to help impoverished children.

Awards
On 8 March 2011, Fran was chosen as one of The Most Inspiring Women in Malaysia by The Star.

Personal life
In 2009, she filed for separation in her marriage, which she announced at the Keunggulan Concert 33 Years Francissca Peter in 2011.

 Discography 

Solo albums

 1984: Komputer Muzik (re-released in 2010)
 1985: Aku Hanya Pendatang 1986: Sekadar Di Pinggiran 1987: Kau Bintangku 1988: Harapan 1989: Pasti Kembali 1989: Now's the Time 1993: Mawar Terpinggir 1995: Captured by a Smile 1997: Setinggi Angkasa 2005: Masih Merindu 2013: Francissca Peter & Friends – The Love & Hope AlbumDuet albums with Royston Sta Maria
 1982: Siapa Dia Sebelum Daku 1982: Bersama Pertemuan IniCompilation albums

 1990: Suara Rindu 1994: Siri Legenda 1997: 10 Tahun Gemilang 1999: Alunan Mesra 2000: Every Journey Travelled 2002: A Christmas Gift 2007: Dulu, Kini dan Selamanya 2008: Berlian 2008: Memori Hit Roy & Fran 2009: Nostalgia Abadi 2009: Memori Hit Francissca Peter 2010: Cinta 101 2010: Keunggulan 2010: Sukma Rindu 2011: Keunggulan 33 Tahun Francissca Peter (10-CD Box Set) 2011: Kenangan Abadi 2011: DIA (mix compilation with Fauziah Latiff) 2011:   The Boxset of ten albums a special edition in conjunction with her big Concert 
 2012: Bintang Lagenda (mix compilation various artist- Francissca Peter, Jamal Abdillah, Ramli Sarip, Khadijah Ibrahim) 2012: 101 Francissca 2013: The Love and Hope Album Singles 

 "To Know Malaysia Is To Love Malaysia" (Carol O Connors – for Tourism Malaysia)
 "Reach For The Sky" (Goh Boon Ho – for the 1988's SEA Games)
 "Setia" ('RTM 2nd National Anthem)
 "Your Love" (Michael Winans USA)
 "You Are" (Brian Simpson USA)
 "Liberian Girl" (Duet with Jazz Saxophonist : Cal Bennett, USA – album Local Hero)
 "I Love You Still" (Manan Ngah)
 "Janji Kekasih" (Fauzi Marzuki)

 "Begitulah Aku" (Manan Ngah)
 "Tomorrow"
 "1 AIA – The Power Of We"
 "Tiada Gementar Lagi"
 "It Starts With Me"
 "Open The World"

CompositionsList of compositions & lyrics by Francissca Peter''

References

External links 

 
 
 
 
 Francissca Peter on SoundCloud
 Francissca Peter on Facebook

Living people
Malaysian women pop singers
Malay-language singers
Malaysian people of Scottish descent
Malaysian people of Indian descent
Malaysian people of Sri Lankan Tamil descent
Malaysian people of Chinese descent
Malaysian Roman Catholics
1961 births
Warner Music Group artists
People from Perak
Malaysian dance musicians
Malaysian jazz singers